Masakali is an Indian television drama series which premiered on Sahara One on 31 March 2014.

Cast
Vishal Ganatra as Vishal
Nisha Nagpal as Chandani
Zafar Ali as R.N. Goyal 
Madan Tyagi as Vinod Goyal
Mugdha Shah as Bhua
Sunil Malik as Nandu
Bharati Sharma as Palki Sharma
Rahila Rehman as Roshni

References

External links
Masakali official website

Indian drama television series
Sahara One original programming
2014 Indian television series debuts
2015 Indian television series endings